The Municipality of Vipava is a municipality in western Slovenia. The seat of the municipality is the town of Vipava. Historically, it used to be a part of the traditional region of Inner Carniola, but it is now generally regarded as a part of the Slovenian Littoral. The municipality was established in its current form on 3 October 1994, when the former larger Municipality of Ajdovščina was subdivided into the municipalities of Ajdovščina and Vipava.

Division
The Municipality of Vipava is subdivided into 11 local communities, which comprise one or more villages. They are Vipava, Erzelj, Goče, Gradišče pri Vipavi, Lozice, Lože, Manče, Podnanos, Podraga, Slap, and Vrhpolje.

References

External links

Municipality of Vipava at Geopedia
Vipava Valley Tourist Association site

 
1994 establishments in Slovenia
Vipava